Operation Tiger Hound was a covert U.S. 2nd Air Division, later Seventh Air Force and U.S. Navy Task Force 77 aerial interdiction campaign conducted in southeastern Laos from 5 December 1965 till 11 November 1968, during the Vietnam War. The purpose of the operation was to interdict the flow of People's Army of Vietnam (PAVN) supplies on the Ho Chi Minh Trail (the Truong Son Strategic Supply Route to the North Vietnamese) from the Democratic Republic of Vietnam (North Vietnam), through southeastern Laos, and into the northern provinces of the Republic of Vietnam (South Vietnam). The missions were originally controlled by the 2d Air Division until that headquarters was superseded by the Seventh Air Force on 1 April 1966.

The geographic boundary of the operation was carved from the area of Laos already under bombardment under Operation Steel Tiger. This was done at the behest of the American commander in South Vietnam, General William C. Westmoreland, who saw the area of Laos that bordered the five northernmost provinces of South Vietnam as an extension of his area of operations. The U.S. Joint Chiefs of Staff agreed. Unlike Operation Barrel Roll and Steel Tiger, however, the bombing in the new area would be conducted by aircraft of the Republic of Vietnam Air Force and by U.S. Air Force units based in South Vietnam (aircraft participating in Barrel Roll and Steel Tiger were generally based in Thailand).

By the end of 1968 and the absorption of Tiger Hound operations by Operation Commando Hunt, 103,148 tactical air sorties had been flown over Laos. These missions were supplemented by 1,718 B-52 Stratofortress sorties under Operation Arc Light. During the same time period, 132 U.S. aircraft or helicopters were shot down over Laos.

Notes

References 
 Littauer, Raphael and Norman Uphoff, eds, The Air War in Indochina. Boston: Beacon Press, 1972.
 Schlight, John, A War Too Long. Washington DC: Center of Air Force History, 1993.
 Van Staaveren, Jacob, Interdiction in Southern Laos: 1960–1968. Washington DC: Center for Air Force History, 1993.

Conflicts in 1965
Conflicts in 1966
Conflicts in 1967
Conflicts in 1968
Tiger Hound
Tiger Hound
Tiger Hound
Tiger Hound
Tiger Hound
1965 in Vietnam
1966 in Vietnam
1967 in Vietnam
1968 in Vietnam
United States Marine Corps in the Vietnam War
Laos–United States relations
Laotian Civil War